Mezoma is a village in Kohima district of Nagaland state of India.

References

Villages in Kohima district